Edward Woodruff Seymour (August 30, 1832 – October 16, 1892) was a Democratic member of the United States House of Representatives from Connecticut, son of Origen Storrs Seymour, great-nephew of Horatio Seymour.

Born in Litchfield, Connecticut, Seymour attended the public schools and was graduated from Yale College in 1853. He studied law. He was admitted to the bar in 1856 and practiced in Litchfield and Bridgeport, Connecticut.

He served as member of the State house of representatives from 1859 to 1860, and from 1870 to 1871. He served in the State senate in 1876.

Seymour was elected as a Democrat to the Forty-eighth and Forty-ninth Congresses (March 4, 1883 – March 3, 1887). He resumed the practice of his profession.

He was appointed as a judge of the Connecticut Supreme Court in 1889.

He died in Litchfield, Connecticut, on October 16, 1892.
He was interred in East Cemetery.

See also

Seymour-Conkling family

References

External links
 

1832 births
1892 deaths
Democratic Party Connecticut state senators
Justices of the Connecticut Supreme Court
Democratic Party members of the Connecticut House of Representatives
Politicians from Bridgeport, Connecticut
Politicians from Litchfield, Connecticut
Yale College alumni
Democratic Party members of the United States House of Representatives from Connecticut
19th-century American politicians
Seymour family (U.S.)
19th-century American judges
19th-century American businesspeople